Wrangle or similar can mean:-

 Wrangle, Lincolnshire, a village in England
 Wrangle, a historical name for the card game Russian Bank

See also

Wrangler (disambiguation)
Wrangel (disambiguation)
Rangel (disambiguation)
 Rangle, stones fed to hawks to aid in digestion